The Bafia languages are a clade of Bantu languages coded Zone A.50 in Guthrie's classification. According to Nurse & Philippson (2003), the languages form a valid node. They are:
Fa’ (Lefa), Kaalong (Dimbong), Kpa (Bafia), Ngayaba (Tibea)
Hijuk was listed as unclassified A.50 in Guthrie, but according to Ethnologue it is quite similar to Basaa.

Footnotes

References